Gunchei is a type of Central America Garifuna dance in which the men take turns dancing with each woman. "Gunchei" can also refer to the music that is played during the dance.

Mexican_culture